This article lists the heads of state of the Central African Republic. There have been seven heads of state of the Central African Republic and the Central African Empire since independence was obtained from the French on 13 August 1960. This list includes not only those persons who were sworn into office as President of the Central African Republic but also those who served as de facto heads of state.

Jean-Bédel Bokassa served as a de facto head of state (and also reigned as Emperor from 1976 to 1979), while David Dacko (who served as de facto head of state from 1979 to 1981), André Kolingba, Ange-Félix Patassé, and François Bozizé were elected into office at some point during their tenure. To date, Kolingba is the only former head of state of the Central African Republic to voluntarily step down from the office through a democratic process, following the 1993 general election.

The current President of the Central African Republic is Faustin-Archange Touadéra, since 30 March 2016.

Political affiliations 

Political parties

Other factions

For heads of state with multiple affiliations, the political party listed first is the party the person was affiliated with at the beginning of the tenure.

Heads of state

Footnotes 
 Dacko became the official President of the Central African Republic after defeating Abel Goumba in an internal power struggle. Dacko had support from the French government.
 Bokassa seized power by staging a coup d'état from 31 December 1965 until 1 January 1966. Bokassa forced Dacko to officially resign from the presidency at 03:20 WAT (02:20 UTC) on 1 January.
 Bokassa staged a military coup against the Dacko government on 31 December 1965 – 1 January 1966. After becoming president, Bokassa took control of MESAN and imposed one-party rule under MESAN.
 Bokassa, then-president for life of the Central African Republic, instituted a new constitution at the session of the MESAN congress and declared the republic a monarchy, the Central African Empire (CAE). Bokassa became the emperor of the CAE as "Bokassa I".
 By 1979, French support for Bokassa had all but eroded after the government's brutal suppression of rioting in Bangui and massacre of schoolchildren who had protested against wearing the expensive, government-required school uniforms. Dacko, who was Bokassa's personal adviser at the time, managed to leave for Paris where the French convinced him to cooperate in a coup to remove Bokassa from power and restore him to the presidency. The French successfully executed Operation Barracuda on 20–21 September 1979 and installed Dacko as president.
 General Kolingba (who was also the armed forces chief of staff) overthrew Dacko from the presidency in a bloodless coup.
 On 21 September 1985, Kolingba dissolved the Military Committee for National Recovery, and created the positions of Head of State and President.
 A constitution was adopted by a referendum on 21 November 1986 and Kolingba was elected to a six-year term in office.
 The country held a multiparty presidential election on 22 August and 19 September 1993. Patassé was the candidate from the Movement for the Liberation of the Central African People party and ran on the platform that he would pay the previously withheld salaries to soldiers and civil servants. Patassé defeated Dacko, Kolingba, Bozizé and Abel Goumba to win the election.
 Bozizé's second coup attempt was successful; he seized power in Bangui on 15 March 2003.
 Djotodia ousted Bozizé in the 2012–13 conflict; he seized power in Bangui on 24 March 2013.
 Under pressure from other central African heads of state gathered for a crisis summit on the situation in CAR, Djotodia resigned in N'Djamena, Chad on 10 January 2014.

Timeline

Latest election

See also 
 Emperor of Central Africa
 List of heads of government of the Central African Republic
 Vice President of the Central African Republic
 List of colonial governors of Ubangi-Shari
 Lists of office-holders

References 

General
.
.
.
.

Specific

External links 
 Official Website 
 Elections in the Central African Republic
 BBC News Timeline: Central African Republic

Central African Republic
Heads of state

Heads of state
Heads of state
Heads of state